Greg Yuna (born ) is an American jeweler.

He began his career in finance but became a jeweler in 2009, working at his uncle’s kiosk in Manhattan’s Diamond District. In 2017, he moved away from the family business and began his own company, Chapter II, also located in the Diamond District. Yuna is known for his Instagram posts shot in the middle of 6th Avenue in Manhattan during a 51-second red traffic light, often involving celebrities wearing his jewelry.

Yuna's designs have been worn by clients including Floyd Mayweather, Drake, Meek Mill, and Victor Cruz. He designed Ariana Grande's engagement ring. He also created a pendant picturing the late rapper Nipsey Hussle for Hussle's longtime girlfriend, Lauren London. Yuna has designed sneaker pendants for Nike.

In 2019, Yuna was an advisor for and had a minor role in the 2019 Adam Sandler film Uncut Gems. He appeared on an episode of Ridiculousness in 2021.

References

Further reading 
   "Greg Yuna on custom watches," Time and Tide Watches, 18 April, 2019
   "Greg Yuna Shows Off His Insane Jewelry Inventory," GQ, 18  March, 2019.
   "INKED PEOPLE: GREG YUNA," Inked, 10 October, 2018.
   "Greg Yüna Pairs Jewelry with Intricate Drawings in Latest Series," Hypebeast, 28 August, 2018.
   "Celebrity Jeweler Mr. Flawless On Floyd Mayweather Buying From Him and What To Invest In," The Breakfast Club, 3 November, 2016.
   "Mr. Flawless: Time To Shine," Vibe, 8 December, 2015.

1980s births
Living people
People from Queens, New York
21st-century American jewellers